This is an incomplete list of paintings by French artist Suzanne Valadon (1865–1938).

Painting

Valadon, Suzanne
Suzanne Valadon